Hacı Ömer Sabancı Holding A.Ş., commonly abbreviated as Sabancı Holding, is an industrial and financial conglomerate with headquarters in Istanbul, Turkey. The company's primary activities are in financial services, energy (electricity generation and distribution), cement, retail and industrial sectors. The founding Sabancı family continues to hold a majority stake. Sabanci Holding was first listed on the Istanbul Stock Exchange (BIST) in 1997.

Operations
Sabancı Group companies operate in 13 countries and market their products in Europe, the Middle East, Asia, North America and South America. The company operates through banking, industry, retail, cement and other segments, and offers corporate and investment, private, commercial, SME, retail, and international banking services, as well as payment systems, treasury transactions, insurance brokerage services, asset management services, and financial leasing services. Sabancı Holding’s multinational business partners include global companies such as Ageas, Bridgestone, Carrefour, E.ON, HeidelbergCement, Marubeni and Komatsu. 

In 2021, Sabancı Group posted combined sales revenue of revenue of TL 152 billion and consolidated net income of TL 12 billion. The Sabancı Family is collectively Sabancı Holding’s majority shareholder, while 49.11% of the Holding’s shares are publicly traded. Sabancı Holding’s own shares as well as the shares of its listed 11 subsidiaries constitute 6% of the total market capitalization of the Turkish equity market as of the end of 2021.

Güler Sabancı, a third-generation member of the Sabancı family, chairs the board of directors. She was appointed after the death of her uncle Sakıp Sabancı, leader of the company since its founding in 1967, in 2004. Erol Sabancı is vice chairman. Other members of the board of directors are Saime Gonca Artunkal (on behalf of Sakıp Sabancı Holding A.Ş.), Serra Sabancı, Suzan Sabancı Dinçer, Ahmet Erdem, Hayri Çulhacı, Mehmet Kahya and Cenk Alper, the company’s CEO.

Industrials 

 Kordsa
 Brisa (joint venture with Bridgestone)
 Temsa Motorlu Araçlar (joint venture with Komatsu)
 Temsa Ulaşım Araçları (joint venture with PPF Group)

Banking 

 Akbank

Retail 

 Teknosa
 Carrefoursa (joint venture with Carrefour)

Financial Services 

 Agesa (joint venture with Ageas)
 Aksigorta (joint venture with Ageas)

Energy 

 Enerjisa (joint venture with E.ON) 
Enerjisa Üretim (joint venture with E.ON): Enerjisa Üretim owns the lignite-fired Tufanbeyli power station.

Building Materials 

 Çimsa
 Akçansa (joint venture with HeidelbergCement)

Others 

 SabancıDX
 Tursa: owns and operates 3 Hilton branded hotels in Adana, Ankara and Mersin

Headquarters

Sabanci Holding relocated its headquarters from Adana to Istanbul in 1974, in the Sabanci Group towers — a twin skyscraper complex in Levent.

References 

Turkish brands
Conglomerate companies of Turkey
Holding companies of Turkey
Companies based in Istanbul
Energy companies established in 1967
Sabancı family
Coal companies of Turkey
Electric power companies of Turkey
Turkish companies established in 1967